David Eugene Price (born August 17, 1940) is an American politician who was the U.S. representative for  from 1997 to 2023, previously holding the position from 1987 to 1995. A member of the Democratic Party, he represented a district covering much of the heart of the Triangle, including all of Orange County and parts of Wake and Durham counties. It included most of Raleigh, parts of Durham, and all of Cary and Chapel Hill. Price was the dean of North Carolina's delegation to the House of Representatives. He had announced that he would retire from Congress in 2022.

Early life and education
Born in Erwin, Tennessee, Price attended Mars Hill College when it was a junior college. He later transferred to the University of North Carolina at Chapel Hill after winning a Morehead Scholarship and became a member of the Dialectic and Philanthropic Societies. He earned his degree in 1961. Originally intent on becoming an engineer, Price continued his education at Yale University, where he received a theology degree (1964) and a Ph.D. in political science (1969).

Career 
Price served as an aide to Alaska Senator Bob Bartlett from 1963 to 1967 and then entered academia, working as a political science and public policy professor at Duke University from 1973 until his first campaign for Congress in 1986. He also served as a Duke professor during 1995 and 1996, when he was not in Congress.

Price worked for the North Carolina Democratic Party from 1979 to 1984. He has written a political science textbook, The Congressional Experience, from the perspective of a candidate for office and then a member of Congress. Price also served as executive director and then state chair of the North Carolina Democratic Party before his election to Congress.

U.S. House of Representatives

Elections
1986–1992
Price first entered Congress in 1987 after defeating one-term Representative Bill Cobey, 56% to 44%. He was reelected in 1988 and 1990 with 58% of the vote. In 1992, he was reelected with 65%.

1994
In 1994, Price lost to the Republican nominee, former Raleigh police chief Fred Heineman, by a margin of less than 1% during the Republican Revolution, in part due to lower-than-expected turnout in the Democratic stronghold of Orange County (home to Chapel Hill), but despite the fact that heavily Republican Randolph County had been eliminated from the fourth district during redistricting.

1996
In 1996, Price defeated Heineman in a rematch, 54% to 44%. He was helped in part by voters who were not happy with the lack of progress made by the freshman class on the goals of the Contract with America.

1998–2006
The district reverted to form, and Price was reelected by wide margins in 1998 (57%), 2000 (62%), 2002 (61%), 2004 (64%), and 2006 (65%).

2008–2020
Price's opponent in the 2008 election was Republican B.J. Lawson. Lawson was called the most formidable opposition Price had faced since he lost to Heineman in 1994. For example, he ran television ads, which Price's opponents hadn't done in at least a decade. Despite Lawson's increased efforts and expenditures, Price defeated him, 63% to 37%.

Price launched his 2010 reelection campaign on September 8 of that year. Price defeated Lawson in a rematch, 56% to 44%.

In 2012, Price defeated the Republican nominee, businessman Tim D'Annunzio. In 2014, he defeated Republican Paul Wright, a trial lawyer, former District Court and Superior Court judge and 2012 candidate for governor of North Carolina. In 2016, Price defeated Republican nominee Sue Googe. In 2018, he defeated Republican nominee Steve Von Loor and Libertarian nominee Barbara Howe. The 4th district was reconfigured as a result of court-mandated redistricting in 2019. The new district shed much of its Raleigh sections in exchange for all of Durham County and several other more rural counties. In 2020, Price defeated Republican nominee Robert Thomas with more than 67% of the vote.

Tenure

Price was an early opponent of the Iraq War of 2003 and sponsored a bill to bring the conduct of private military companies working in Iraq under legal jurisdiction of the United States. He has also introduced legislation to prohibit contractors from performing interrogations of prisoners in the custody of intelligence agencies.

As chairman of the 2008 House subcommittee responsible for determining the budget for the Department of Homeland Security, Price sought to focus immigration enforcement efforts on criminal convicts.

Price authored a provision of the Taxpayer Relief Act of 1997 that made the interest on student loans tax-deductible, and legislation creating the Advanced Technological Education program at the National Science Foundation, which provides grants for high-tech education in community colleges and was enacted in 1993. He voted for the Emergency Economic Stabilization Act of 2008, reasoning that "the harmful effects of the credit crisis on all North Carolinians were too great for the federal government to sit on the sidelines." and for "[defending] critical emergency management and homeland security priorities" received an award from the association of state emergency managers. In December 2009, he voted for the Wall Street Reform and Consumer Protection Act, which enacted more stringent regulations on the financial industry to protect consumers and taxpayers from another financial crisis.

Price was the author of legislation to reform the public financing system for presidential campaigns.

Price has opposed concentration of media ownership. He worked on legislative initiatives to roll back the FCC's 2003 rules and co-sponsored an unsuccessful bill to overturn another 2008 FCC approval of media consolidation. Price voted for the 2006 "Markey amendment" to establish network neutrality in the Communication Act of 1934.

In 2013, Price voted against the amendment to the Patriot Act that would have eliminated Section 215 and curtailed the National Security Agency's controversial data collection program.

On October 18, 2021, Price announced that he would not seek reelection.

Committee assignments
Committee on Appropriations
Subcommittee on Homeland Security 
Subcommittee on the Legislative Branch
Subcommittee on Transportation, Housing and Urban Development, and Related Agencies (Chair)

Caucus memberships
Congressional Humanities Caucus (Co-Chair)
House Democracy Partnership
United States Congressional International Conservation Caucus
National Service Caucus (Co-Chair)
Congressional Arts Caucus
Veterinary Medicine Caucus
House Baltic Caucus
Afterschool Caucuses
Congressional NextGen 9-1-1 Caucus
America's Language Caucus

Price also chaired the House Democracy Assistance Commission.

Personal life
Price married his wife, Lisa Kanwit, in 1968. They were longtime Democratic Party activists together, and have two children: Karen, a filmmaker; and Michael, a professor of Evolutionary Psychology at Brunel University in London. They have three grandchildren. Price resides in Chapel Hill and is a member of the Binkley Memorial Baptist Church.

Price received the 2011 John Tyler Caldwell Award for the Humanities from the North Carolina Humanities Council.

Electoral history

References

External links

Congressman David Price official U.S. House website
David Price for Congress 

|-

|-

1940 births
21st-century American politicians
American political scientists
Baptists from Tennessee
Democratic Party members of the United States House of Representatives from North Carolina
Duke University faculty
Living people
Mars Hill University alumni
North Carolina Democratic Party chairs
People from Unicoi County, Tennessee
United States congressional aides
University of North Carolina at Chapel Hill alumni
Yale University alumni